Inclacumab (LC1004-002) (INN) is a human monoclonal antibody designed for the treatment of cardiovascular disease.

The antibody is outlicensed by Roche.

References 

Monoclonal antibodies